Agrotera ornata is a moth in the family Crambidae. It was described by Wileman and South in 1917. It is found in Taiwan.

References

Moths described in 1917
Spilomelinae
Moths of Taiwan